Spargapeithes was the name of a number of kings of various peoples belonging to Scythian cultures.

 Spargapeithes (Scythian king), a king of the Scythians
 Spargapises, a prince of the Massagetae
 Spargapeithes (Agathyrsian king), a king of the Agathyrsi